Boke may refer to:

People
 Ariq Böke, grandson of Genghis Khan and claimant to the Mongol Empire
 Abba Boke, first king of the Kingdom of Gomma in the Gibe region of Ethiopia
 Uncle Boke, the uncle of author Henry Louis Gates, Jr. described in Colored People

Places
 Boke (woreda), a district in the Oromia Region of Ethiopia
 Boke, a district in Delbrück, Germany
 Boké, a city in Lower Guinea

Fictional characters
 Boke, several characters in the works of Vladimir Nabokov
 Mr. Boke, a detective in Flight of Faviel by Robert Ernest Vernède
 Boke, a role of Howard Keel in The Small Voice
 Boke, a pet dog in Judo Boy
 Miss Ethel Boke, a character in the novel Seventeen by Booth Tarkington
 Boke Kellum, Western TV star in Dan Jenkins' Semi-Tough
 Boke-gaeru ("stupid frog"), Natsumi Hinata's epithet for Sergeant Keroro in Sgt. Frog

Others
 Bökh (or Böke), a form of Mongolian wrestling
 Boke, the "simple-minded" character in a Manzai team, a form of Owarai kombi (Japanese comedy act)
 Boke no mi or Japanese quince, a flowering shrub of the genus Chaenomeles
 Bokeh (or boke), a Japanese word used in photography to describe the out-of-focus quality of a lens
 Bhoke (station code BOKE), a railway station in India
 Boke Press, the personal press of Joe Brainard and Kenward Elmslie.

See also
 Democratic Centre of Boka, a political party in Montenegro
 Oboke and Koboke, two valleys in Tokushima Prefecture, Japan
 "Fuyōi na Boke to Yasashisa ga Fukō o Yobu", an episode of Hayate the Combat Butler
 "Bolden Boke Boy", a song by Will Oldham
 Boak, a surname
 Bokeh (disambiguation)
 Bouquet (disambiguation)